Memorial Stadium is a stadium in Mesquite, Texas.  It was completed in 1976 and is located on the campus of West Mesquite High School, next to Mesquite Tower. The field is primarily used for football, and all five High Schools in Mesquite share use of the field.

The stadium has a capacity of 19,400 people, making it the largest high school football stadium in Texas. It's the largest stadium in Mesquite, followed by EH Hanby Stadium, a 11,950-capacity football and soccer stadium. Due to its size and central location, the field is often used as a neutral-site for Texas High School Football playoff games. UIL Marching competitions are frequently hosted as well.

Renovations
A massive $11 million renovation began in November 2014 and was completed by August 2015  in time for the upcoming high school football season. Among the new improvements was new façade, expanded concession and restroom areas, a new press box and locker rooms as well as an enlarged concourse area and elevators.

References

External links
Memorial Stadium

American football venues in the Dallas–Fort Worth metroplex
High school football venues in Texas
Sports venues in Texas
Mesquite, Texas
1977 establishments in Texas
Sports venues completed in 1977